Imajica is a fantasy novel by British author Clive Barker. Barker, in 1997, named it as his favourite of all his writings up to that point. The work, 824 pages at its first printing in 1991, chronicles the events surrounding the reconciliation of Earth, called the Fifth Dominion, with the other four Dominions, parallel worlds unknown to all but a select few of Earth's inhabitants. Considered wide in scope, elaborate in its imagery, and meticulous in its detail, the novel covers themes such as God, sex, love, gender and death.

Plot introduction

Conception 
The inspiration and many of the ideas for Imajica came to Clive Barker in dreams, and so inspired, he worked at an intense pace to complete the novel. Barker has stated he wrote the novel in fourteen months; writing fourteen to sixteen hours a day, seven days a week.

Backstory 
The Earth is actually just one part of five connected worlds or Dominions, called the Imajica. Overseeing all of the dominions is the Unbeheld, Hapexamendios (God). However, Earth became separated from the other four worlds long ago. This explains both the appearance of extraordinary phenomena on Earth and the lack of understanding of magic and acceptance of the extraordinary as commonplace (as it is in the other four worlds). The void that separates Earth from her sister worlds is called the "In Ovo".

Great magic users called Maestros have attempted through the ages to reconcile the Earth with the remaining Imajica, including Christ. This Reconciliation can only happen once every 200 years. All previous attempts failed; the most recent resulted in the horrific death or madness of those involved. A secret society known as the Tabula Rasa formed after this failure; its directive is to prevent the use of magic on the Earth, motivated by the fear that such a disaster may occur again. At the present time, three reconciled Dominions are ruled by the Autarch, who lives in the great city of Yzordderrex in the Second Dominion, while the first dominion – though reconciled – is kept inaccessible by the power of the Unbeheld who resides there.

Plot summary

The Fifth Dominion 

The novel opens with a man, Charlie Estabrook, hiring the mysterious assassin Pie'oh'pah to murder his estranged wife, Judith.
Pie heads to New York and makes an attempt on Judith's life, but fails. Estabrook, having come to regret hiring the assassin to kill Judith, then contacts Judith's former lover, an artist named John Furie Zacharias also known as "Gentle", and asks Gentle to protect her.
Later, Gentle comes upon Judith just as Pie is making a second attempt on her life. Gentle chases Pie away, but Pie, who has the ability to change its exterior, later disguises itself as Judith and comes to Gentle's apartment with the intent of having sex with him. During their tryst, Judith calls, alerting Gentle to the fact that he is in fact coupling with the shape-shifting assassin. Gentle is horrified and demands that Pie leave.

Meanwhile, the Tabula Rasa meet at Roxborough Tower to discuss the recent events regarding Pie'oh'pah. A man from one of the other Dominions named Dowd is ordered by the council to bring his master, Oscar Godolphin, to see them. Despite being a member of the Tabula Rasa, Godolphin frequently travels between Earth and the reconciled dominions. Godolphin meets with the Tabula Rasa and murders Dowd in front of them, convincing them that Dowd was actually a doppelganger who had taken on Godolphin's appearance while travelling between worlds. Godolphin later revives Dowd and gives him permission to kill Pie.

Judith returns to England and sneaks into Estabrook's house to steal back some of her former property. She also discovers a strange blue stone that causes her to have an out of body experience, during which she witnesses a mummified woman being kept prisoner by the Tabula Rasa in the Roxborough Tower.

Gentle, meanwhile, has another encounter with Pie, and the two of them pass through the "In Ovo" to the Fourth Dominion. Judith, who was coming to see Gentle, arrives just as the two go away.

The Fourth Dominion 

Pie and Gentle arrive in the Fourth Dominion and head to the nearby village of Vanaeph, where the Autarch is coming to investigate rumours of rebellion. They soon get into a conflict with some locals and are helped by a man named Tick Raw. Later, Gentle is confronted by a creature known as a 'Nullianac', and manages to kill it using a protective spell called a 'pneuma'. Pie and Gentle then head to the mountains to find a way of breaking into the Third Dominion.

Back on Earth, Judith meets up with Estabrook to find information about his brother, Oscar Godolphin. After leaving Estabrook for dead in the Second Dominion, Godolphin begins a relationship with Judith.

Meanwhile, in the Fourth Dominion, Gentle and Pie find the frozen bodies of a group of women who were killed by Hapexamendios during his journey across the Dominions. Gentle ends up freeing the women, who then lead Gentle and Pie to a frozen doorway leading into the Third Dominion.

The Third Dominion 

Judith meets with a woman named Clara Leash, a former member of the Tabula Rasa. When the two try to break into Roxborough Tower to free the prisoner from Judith's vision, Dowd arrives and kills Clara.

Meanwhile, Gentle and Pie travel through the third dominion searching for an old friend of Pie's named Scopique. They learn that Scopique is being held in a prison at the Cradle, a giant lake whose waters remain frozen unless the cloud cover breaks, allowing the sunlight to shine on the surface. Gentle and Pie make their way across the Cradle just as the sun starts to rise, and when the lake becomes liquid again Gentle almost drowns, taking days to recover.

Once in the prison, Pie is reunited with Scopique and Gentle befriends Aping, the second in command and an artist like Gentle. Gentle becomes upset when he learns that Pie has been having sex with N'Ashap, the commandant of the prison, in return for Gentle being nursed back to health, leading the two to admit their feelings for each other and decide to get married. Security tightens at the prison, however, and the two realise that they must soon escape. Aping asks Gentle to take his daughter Huzzah with them when they leave.

Eventually the opportunity arises and Gentle, Pie, Scopique, Aping and Huzzah all flee across the lake at night, while the waters are still solid. Aping is killed, and Scopique chooses to stay behind after N'Ashap is overthrown and killed. Gentle, Pie and Huzzah are able to successfully escape and head to the Second Dominion.

The Second Dominion

Around the time that Gentle and the others head to the Second Dominion towards Yzordderrex, the Autarch visits a retreat which used to be the location of the 'Pivot', a large monument which was moved to his palace in Yzordderrex. It is here where we first learn that the Autarch is familiar with Earth, particularly the locales that our heroes are from.

Judith finally convinces Godolphin to bring her to Yzordderrex with the threat of leaving him. They head to the retreat where they originally met, but as Godolphin starts their transference to the second dominion, Dowd comes and interferes and ends up going through to Yzordderrex with Judith instead of Godolphin. They arrive in the house of Peccable, a merchant friend of Godolphin's. Arriving in Yzordderrex, Gentle, Pie and Huzzah encounter an entourage containing the Autarch's Queen, Quaisoir, and Gentle is shocked to find out that her appearance is identical to that of Judith's. With the rebellions in Yzordderrex getting out of control, she flees and Gentle becomes convinced that he has to head to the palace to find out if it is really her. Judith meanwhile has another out of body experience where she witnesses Quaisoir after a fight with the Autarch, who is upset with her becoming enamored with religion, and Father Athanasius, the leader of the 'Dearther' group of rebels (and the man who wed Gentle and Pie at the Cradle). Gentle, Pie and Huzzah arrive at the Eurhetemec Kesperate (district) that Pie is from and find it mostly deserted except for four people, who have a hard time believing that they're not the enemy. Pie tells Gentle and Huzzah to meet him later at a cafe they were eating at. Although Huzzah and Gentle return there, with the chaos going on they leave and encounter a group that includes a Nullianac that kidnaps Huzzah. Gentle chases after them and eventually defeats the Nullianac, but not before it rapes and kills Huzzah.

Put on trial, Pie explains itself, saying that it became entrapped in the in Ovo and was summoned to the Fifth Dominion by the Maestro Sartori, who had led the attempt at reconciliation 200 years ago. Pie felt bound to him which is why it never returned until now. Pie is instructed that it is banned from returning to the Eurhetemec Kesperate until it kills the Autarch. Pie heads there with a fellow group of its species but most are killed and it tells its final companion to leave when it finds paintings of familiar places from Earth in the palace. Gentle as well heads to the palace with a follower of Athanasius, who found the still living Estabrook after he was left for dead after his fight with Godolphin. When they are caught by one of the Autarch's generals, Gentle's companion is killed, but Gentle is surprisingly let go when the general sees his face.

Quaisoir meanwhile flees from the palace in search of Athanasius but instead is encountered by a group of rebels who attack her, blinding her by stabbing her in the eyes. Dowd and Judith, who had been having more visions of her, soon arrive and all the rebels are either killed or flee. Quaisoir at first thinks Dowd is her Lord but when Judith spoils the illusion by talking, Dowd tries to kill her. Judith flees as Dowd attacks Quaisoir instead and ends up near a large well. Dowd catches up to her and is about to kill her by throwing her in there. About to die, Judith has visions of her origin, she was created as a replica of Quaisoir hundreds of years before. Quaisoir, amazingly still alive arrives and using her power saves Judith and lets Dowd fall in the well after he reveals that hundreds of years before he found a woman for Hapexamendios, Celestine, who bore him a child.

Gentle makes it to the top of the palace where he encounters the Autarch, who reveals that Gentle is the Maestro Sartori, who led the failed effort to reconcile the Dominions 200 years before. Going to see the Pivot, Gentle is told that he has to make another attempt at Reconciliation. Through explanation by the Autarch and a vision he witnesses, the true events of what happened 200 years before are finally revealed. As Sartori, he was in love with Judith, the lover of Joshua Godolphin, and was able to convince Joshua to let him create a replica of her through magic. During the long process of replicating her however, he got drunk and went into the circle that she was being replicated in, and made love to her. This resulted in a replica of himself being created as well. Once the Reconciliation failed, the replica of Sartori left to the Dominions and eventually became the ruler of them as the Autarch. The original Judith became his queen, Quaisoir, while the replica, the Judith we've come to know throughout the book, remained on Earth, bound to the Godolphin family. Sartori convinced Pie to cast a feit on him that caused him to continuously lose his memory of the event. The Autarch wants Gentle to join him as he goes to conquer the Fifth Dominion but Gentle refuses. While fleeing, Pie comes across the Autarch, and attacks Gentle when he arrives. Although Gentle is able to convince Pie that it is the real him, the Autarch (referred to from this point on through the rest of the book as 'Sartori') attacks Pie, mortally wounding it, then escapes.

Gentle decides to bring Pie to a Dearther camp at the Erasure, the border between the Second and First Dominions where Estabrook was healed earlier. Pie heads off into the Erasure after Gentle reluctantly lets him go. Gentle meets up with Father Athanasius again who attempts to kill him, but the entire camp is destroyed by the power of Hapexamendios, who pulls Pie back into the First Dominion when it tries to leave. Among those killed is Estabrook, who was still living at the camp after being healed there. Gentle is determined to reconcile the dominions and enlists the help of a man at the Erasure, Chicka Jackeen.

Return to the Fifth Dominion

Gentle returns to the palace in Yzordderrex where he's reunited with Judith. The entire palace including the Pivot starts to collapse and while they are able to escape, Quaisoir is killed. Gentle and Judith go to Peccable's house and then return to Earth. Gentle decides to return to the house on Gamut Street where he attempted Reconciliation 200 years before and some of the memories from that time return to his head. His returned memories include those of conversations with Joshua Godolphin and the ancestors of those in the Tabula Rasa, as well as a young man, Lucius Cobbitt. Also remembered is the moments after the reconciliation failed and the horror brought upon everyone when Sartori tampered with the ceremony and creatures from the In Ovo were released. Gentle has a vision of those killed attacking him, a sort of 'final rite of passage' as his memories return. A creature known as Little Ease sent by Sartori invades Gentle's mind and tells him that Sartori will use him to prevent the Reconciliation from occurring by any way possible. When Gentle leaves the house, Little Ease releases all of Gentle's memories from the past 200 years into his mind, harming him tremendously. Gentle, scarred from the event later appears where some homeless people are living and is almost killed by one of them until he uses a pneuma to defend himself. He befriends Monday, a fellow artist. Judith meanwhile sleeps with Sartori, thinking that he is Gentle.

After being reunited with old colleagues like Klein, Clem and Oscar, Judith becomes obsessed with freeing Celestine from her prison below Roxborough Tower. She and Oscar eventually head to Roxborough Tower after all of the Tabula Rasa end up being killed. When they split up, Oscar ends up getting attacked by Dowd (still alive, with pieces from the Pivot shoved into his body), who slices him up much in the same way that Oscar did to him near the start of the book. Judith arrives just as Oscar dies. After speaking with Dowd, Judith returns to the basement of the tower and frees Celestine, who then fights and defeats Dowd. Celestine tells Judith that she wants to see Maestro Sartori. Clem, one night while helping the homeless, finds Gentle and helps him get his senses back. Gentle heads off with him, and Monday tags along. Sartori meanwhile reveals to Judith (who still thinks he's Gentle) that he has impregnated her when she tries to get him to see Celestine. Judith tells him to go see Celestine. The real Gentle arrives shortly afterwards with Clem and Monday, and they head to Roxborough Tower, where Sartori has already met Celestine, who reveals that he was the child she bore when she was raped by Hapexamendios hundreds of years before. Gentle and Sartori do battle while the others help Celestine out of the tower.

The Reconciliation

Once their battle is over, Gentle and the others head back to the house on Gamut Street where Judith captures Little Ease. In exchange for not being killed, Little Ease swears allegiance to Gentle. Gentle has Judith and Monday return to Godolphin's retreat to retrieve stones to be used in the ceremony, while there Judith encounters Dowd one last time. Before dying, Dowd leaves some doubt in Judith's mind about what Hapexamendios's intentions really are and whether the Reconciliation will be a good thing or not. Judith decides to head to Yzordderrex to see the Goddesses and find out from them whether or not the Reconciliation should go forward. She tells Monday to return to Gentle with that message and heads to Yzordderrex.

Gentle sends his spirit across the Imajica to meet with the other Maestros joining him in the Reconciliation: Tick Raw in the Fourth, Scopique in the Third, Athanasius in the Second (who Scopique was able to convince to help them), and Chicka Jackeen near the First (who is revealed to be Lucius).  Judith meanwhile makes it to Yzordderrex and heads to the Autarch's palace, now in ruins and flooded.  There she is able to meet with the Goddesses, Tishallulé, Jokalaylau, and Uma Umagammagi, who had been trapped in the Pivot until its destruction.  Initially distrusting of her, the Goddesses convene among themselves and tell Judith that it is all right to go ahead with the reconciliation. They also reveal to her that when reconciled, the Imajica is a circle and that Judith may one day be among the Goddesses. It is also revealed that, because the Imajica is a circle, the souls of the dead ones will not be able to escape the Imajica itself as they hoped with the Reconciliation.

Judith returns to the Fifth Dominion, to the house on Gamut Street.  Gentle begins the Reconciliation as everyone else in the house keeps watch for Sartori and his minions to make sure they don't interfere.  When they do arrive, they kill Little Ease and Sartori confronts Judith.  He now seems a changed man, saying that once the dominions are reconciled Hapexamendios will turn them to a wasteland.  Sartori tries to convince Judith that they should kill themselves, but she instead rushes back in the house to try and stop Gentle from completing the Reconciliation.  She enters the circle where he is performing it and Sartori soon follows.  Gentle tampers with one of the stones used in the ceremony to attack Sartori. The two do battle and Sartori severely wounds Gentle by stabbing him, then takes his place and returns the stone to its rightful place.  Sartori's minions carry Gentle's body out of the room to Celestine and Judith accompanies them as the clock strikes midnight and the Reconciliation is completed.  Celestine tells Gentle to send his spirit to see Hapexamendios and convince him to send his fire their way, as the god is unaware that the Imajica is a circle, and his attack would simply come back to him.

Gentle's spirit makes its way through the Dominions, passing through the Erasure into the First Dominion.  There Gentle sees a magnificent, seemingly infinitely large city that initially appears to be deserted.  After some help from a Nullianac, Gentle realises the truth, that Hapexamendios himself is the city.  Gentle starts speaking to Hapexamendios and convinces him to show his human form, which is gigantic, but also distorted and misshapen.  When Celestine is brought up, Hapexamendios grows angry and sends a flame across the dominions to kill her.  Celestine is vaporised, but with the circle of the Imajica now restored, it returns to the first dominion and destroys Hapexamendios himself.  Severely burned by Hapexamendios's fire, Sartori dies in Judith's arms.

The weeks and months go by and the Dominions slowly become used to becoming reconciled.  Many, like Tick Raw, come from the various Dominions to see Gentle, but he can only think about Pie.  Judith leaves to Yzordderrex to give birth to her child, a daughter whom she names Huzzah, and Gentle and Monday follow and are eventually reunited with her.  They then head to the first dominion to see Chicka Jackeen and Gentle parts with them, never to return.  Monday and Chicka Jackeen head back to the Fifth to see Clem with a map of the Imajica Gentle has been working on and his last message. On the promontory, Gentle looks down and sees beyond the waves what looks like another sky but is, in reality, a gate outside Imajica that his father tried to seal and was reopened by the Goddesses. Jumping into this gate, Gentle becomes reunited with Pie'oh'pah outside of the Imajica; meanwhile in the Fifth Dominion, Jackeen, Monday and Clem start drawing Gentle's map of the Imajica on every wall.

Game
Inspired by the book, the Imajica Customizable Card Game (CCG) was released by Harper Prism in August 1997. The game was designed by Sean Curren and Hans Rueffert as a customizable card game for two or more players. 

The game was released with a starter package that included two 60-card decks, and 15-card booster packs.

Further reading
Christian Daumann: Wonderlands in Flesh and Blood. Gender, the body, its boundaries and their transgression in Clive Barker's "Imajica". .

References

External links
 Revelations – The Official Clive Barker Online Resource – Includes a full bibliography, filmography and frequently updated news.

1991 British novels
1991 fantasy novels
British fantasy novels
Novels by Clive Barker
HarperCollins books